BC Dzūkija was a basketball club located in Alytus, Lithuania. It was founded in 2012 and participated in the Lietuvos krepšinio lyga (LKL). It was the newest basketball club based in Alytus after BC Alita and BC Alytus were dissolved. The club was bought by Lithuanian businessman Gediminas Žiemelis in June 2022, who formed BC Wolves soon after.

History
In 2019, the club changed its name to Sintek-Dzūkija for sponsorship reasons.

It dissolved in 2022 after businessman Gediminas Žiemelis bought the club. The team’s last game was Game 4 of the 2021-22 LKL playoffs, where they lost to Rytas Vilnius and lost the series 1-3.

Notable players

 Adam Lapeta (2013-2016, 2021–2022)
 Giedrius Gustas (2014-2016)
 Artūras Jomantas (2014–2015, 2018–2022)
 Tadas Rinkūnas (2015-2016, 2020–2022)
 Julius Jucikas (2016)
 Katin Reinhardt (2017-2018)
 Perry Petty (2018)
 Egidijus Dimša (2018–2020)
 Ken Brown (2018)
 Steponas Babrauskas (2018–2019)
 Kerem Kanter (2019)
 Chauncey Collins (2019-2020)

Season by season

Source:

Head coaches
 Valdemaras Chomičius 2018–2020
 Nikola Vasilev 2020–present

References

 
Basketball teams in Lithuania
Sport in Alytus
2012 establishments in Lithuania
2022 disestablishments in Lithuania
Basketball teams established in 2012
Basketball teams disestablished in 2022